Tadeusz Gosiewski (23 July 1900 in Olchowiec – 15 December 1969 in Nairobi) was a Polish nobleman.

He was a renowned lawyer, diplomat and chevalier of the Order of Malta.

References
 http://www.jurzak.pl Dynastic Genealogy
 http://www.gosiewski.pl Marcin Gosiewski (Ślepowron CoA):

1900 births
1969 deaths
20th-century Polish nobility
20th-century Polish lawyers
Polish diplomats
Polish military personnel of World War II
Tadeusz
Polish exiles
Knights of Malta
Polish emigrants to Kenya